Heliocheilus cistella is a moth in the family Noctuidae. It is found in the Australian states of Northern Territories, Queensland and Western Australia.

References

Heliocheilus
Moths of Australia